Iveta Bieliková (born August 17, 1966) is a former Slovak basketball player. She competed in the women's tournament at the 1992 Summer Olympics.

References

External links
Profile at eurobasket.com

1966 births
Living people
Sportspeople from Ružomberok
Slovak women's basketball players
Czechoslovak women's basketball players
Point guards
Olympic basketball players of Czechoslovakia
Basketball players at the 1992 Summer Olympics